elseq 1–5 is the twelfth studio album by British electronic music duo Autechre, released by Warp Records on 19 May 2016. The album consists of five segments, each roughly 50 minutes in length. All five were made available for individual or group purchase as a digital download only, making it Autechre's first album without a physical release.

Composition and production 
As with their previous album Exai, the album was composed using custom-made Max/MSP software patches. In an interview with Resident Advisor, Brown explained that he and Booth had been working on tracks by sending them back and forth to each other for "quite a bit", and was not sure whether the project consisted as a single album or a collection of albums or EPs.

Release
The first track on the album, "feed1", was given a preview broadcast by BBC Radio 6 on 13 May 2016. A second track, "c16 deep tread", was played on Alaskan student radio station KSUA on 18 May 2016, the track being later released for streaming on Warp Records' SoundCloud page.  The album was released for purchase on the duo's webstore the following day. The album consists of five distinct parts, each with its own album and individual track artwork designed by The Designers Republic. Warp Records stated that there are no plans to release the album on a physical medium, making the album Autechre's first digital-only studio album release.

Reception

The album received generally favorable review from critics. Pitchfork rated volumes 1–5 of the album individually, with scores of 7.0, 6.6, 6.9, 7.1, and 6.8 on a ten-point scale, calling the album "an advancement of the duo's recent live sets, offering a similar ratio of rhythm to noise and order to chaos, but a richer palette of sounds." Resident Advisor called it "among the most uncompromising, impressive and enjoyable collections released by Rob Brown and Sean Booth."  In a mostly positive review, AllMusic noted the length and experimental nature of the material, concluding that "those new to Autechre might be best off starting with their earlier material, and working their way up to this gradually."

Accolades

Track listing

References

External links
elseq 1–5 on Autechre Store

2016 albums
Autechre albums
Warp (record label) albums
Albums with cover art by The Designers Republic